Grading in education is the process of applying standardized measurements for varying levels of achievements in a course. Grades can be assigned as letters (usually A through F), as a range (for example, 1 to 6), as a percentage, or as a number out of a possible total (often out of 100).

In some countries, grades are averaged to create a grade point average (GPA). GPA is calculated by using the number of grade points a student earns in a given period of time.  GPAs are often calculated for high school, undergraduate, and graduate students, and can be used by potential employers or educational institutions to assess and compare applicants. A cumulative grade point average (CGPA), sometimes referred to as just GPA, is a measure of performance for all of a student's courses.

History
Yale University historian George Wilson Pierson writes: "According to tradition the first grades issued at Yale (and possibly the first in the country) were given out in the year 1785, when President Ezra Stiles, after examining 58 Seniors, recorded in his diary that there were 'Twenty Optimi, sixteen second Optimi, twelve Inferiores (Boni), ten Pejores.'" Yale later converted these adjectives into numbers on a 4-point scale, and some historians say this is the origin of the standard modern American GPA scale.

Bob Marlin argues that the concept of grading students' work quantitatively was developed by a tutor named William Farish and first implemented by the University of Cambridge in 1792. That assertion has been questioned by Christopher Stray, who finds the evidence for Farish as the inventor of the numerical mark to be unpersuasive. Stray's article also explains the complex relationship between the mode of examination (oral or written) and the varying philosophies of education these modes imply to both the teacher and the student. As a technology, grading both shapes and reflects many fundamental areas of educational theory and practice.

The A-D/F system was first adopted by Mount Holyoke College in 1897.

Criticism 
It is criticized that grades are only short-term snapshots of how much a student has learned in a given period of time, which only partially reflect the actual performance and does not take sufficient account of the individual development of students. Likewise, poor grades over a longer period of time would give students the impression that they would learn very little or nothing, which jeopardizes the innate intrinsic motivation of every child to learn. Children who have already lost their desire to learn and only study for their grades have no reason to continue learning after they have achieved the best possible grade. In addition, poor grades represent destructive feedback for students, since they do not provide any constructive assistance, but only absolute key figures. It is also criticized that the way of thinking, which can often be traced back to the grading system, that bad grades lead to poor future prospects, leads to perplexity, pressure and stress and depression among parents and children.

It is criticized that students often do not learn for their future life or out of interest in the material, but only for the grades and the associated status, which promotes bulimic learning.

German philosopher and publicist Richard David Precht criticizes the system of school grades in his book Anna, die Schule und der liebe Gott: Der Verrat des Bildungssystems an unseren Kindern. He believes that numbers from 1 to 6 do not do justice to the personalities of the children. In his opinion, grades are neither meaningful nor differentiated and therefore not helpful. For example, the questions whether a student has become more motivated, is more interested in a topic, has learned to deal better with failure and whether he has developed new ideas cannot be answered with grades. Instead, Precht suggests a differentiated written assessment of the students' learning and development path. In his opinion, the grading system comes from a psychologically and pedagogically uninformed era and does not belong in the 21st century.

German educational innovator Margret Rasfeld criticizes the system of grades as unhelpful and, in her opinion, the resulting competitive thinking in schools and says: "School is there to organize success and not to document failure."

German neuroscientist Gerald Hüther criticizes grades for being responsible for ensuring that students cannot specialize in any topic that they are enthusiastic about and have a talent for, since otherwise their grades in other areas would deteriorate. He also believes that "our society will not develop further...if we force all children to conform to the same evaluation standards".

Grading may also reflect the bias of the instructor thereby reinforcing systematic bias.

Grading systems by country

Most nations have their own grading system, and different institutions in a single nation can vary in their grading systems as well. However, several international standards for grading have arisen recently, such as the European Baccalaureate.

England and Wales
In the General Certificate of Secondary Education (GCSE) exam taken by secondary school students in England and Wales, grades generally range from 9 (highest) to 1 (lowest). These replaced earlier A, B, C... grading. However, in GCSE Science, Mathematics Statistics, and any Modern Foreign Language, there are two tiers (higher and foundation). In the higher tier, grades 9 to 4 can be achieved, while in the foundation tier, only grades 5 to 1 can be awarded. The new 9–1 qualifications saw some more subjects such as English language and English literature go 'tierless,’ with the same paper covering all levels of demand. Generally, a 4 or above would be considered a pass and a 3 or below would be considered a fail by most institutions: for Mathematics and English Language and English Literature, and possibly Science, this would require a resit.

If a candidate does not score highly enough to get a grade 1, their results slip will have the letter U for "ungraded", meaning no grade was secured. Other letters such as X also exist in special circumstances.

In Wales, the grading is still from A* (highest) to G (lowest) with U a fail.

United States

Most colleges and universities in the United States award a letter grade A (best), B, C, D, or F (fail) for each class taken (potentially with + or − modifiers). These letter grades are then used to calculate a GPA from 0 to 4.0, using a formula where 4.0 is the best. The average GPA is 3.3 at private institutions and 3.0 at public institutions.

Various colleges, such as Evergreen State College and Hampshire College, do not use traditional grades. Brown University, an Ivy League school, does not calculate grade point averages, and all classes can be taken on a pass/fail basis. Another university that does not follow the grade point average is Antioch University, a private university with multiple locations in the United States. Antioch University focuses on knowledge and learning; professors write a written assessment of students regarding their academic performance in the class. Students' transcripts show a pass/fail, or they can request that their narrative assessments accompany their official transcript. 

A small percentage of high schools also do not use traditional grades. A notable example is Saint Ann's School in Brooklyn, which was ranked by The Wall Street Journal in 2004 as the number one high school in the country for having the highest percentage of graduating seniors enroll in Ivy League and several other highly selective colleges,

For college admission purposes, in addition to grades, colleges also typically review other material submitted by applicants and others, such as student essays, letters of recommendation, assessments of sports program potential, transcripts identifying which courses a student has taken, and scores from standardized test programs such as the SAT, ACT, Advanced Placement tests in particular subjects, and state-established testing scores.

GPA in the United States job market
According to a study published in 2014, a one-point increase in high-school GPA is correlated with an 11.85% increase in annual earnings for men and 13.77% for women in the United States.

College students often wonder how much weight GPA carries in their employment prospects. In many fields, work experience (such as internships) gained during one's time in college are the most important factors that employers consider. Other factors include choice of major, volunteering, choice of extracurricular activities, relevance of coursework, GPA, and the reputation of one's college. The relative importance of these factors do vary between professions, but for a graduate's first job out of college, GPA is often quite high on the list of factors that employers consider. There is also criticism about using grades as an indicator in employment. Armstrong (2012) claimed that the relationship between grades and job performance is low and becoming lower in recent studies. Grade inflation at American colleges over recent decades has also played a role in the devaluation of grades.

India
Different educational boards use different metrics in awarding grades to students, along with the marks obtained in most cases. Central Board of Secondary Education follows a positional grading system where grades are given on basis of the position of the student, if the student is in the top 1/8 of the rank of the no. of passing candidates, grade is A1, next 1/8 A2, next 1/8 B1, and so on. This grading system is based on the relative position of the student rather than the actual marks, it compares marks of different students and then a grade is given.

See also
 Grading on a curve
 Sudbury school, a school model for ages 4 through 18 with schools internationally with no grading or grade levels
Competency-based learning, an alternative to the traditional letter grade system
Mastery Transcript Consortium, a group working to create alternatives to the traditional grading system in secondary schools
 Report card
 Test score

References

Academic transfer
Education reform
Educational evaluation methods
Student assessment and evaluation